Fray Tomás de Berlanga (1487 – 8 August 1551) was the fourth Bishop of Panamá.

Biography
Tomás de Berlanga was born in Berlanga de Duero in Soria, Spain.  On February 11, 1534, Pope Clement VII appointed him Bishop of Panama. On May 17, 1534, he was consecrated bishop by Francisco Mendoza de Bobadilla, Bishop of Coria. Francisco Mendoza, Bishop of Palencia, was co-consecrator, with Father Francisco de Navarra y Hualde assisting.

In 1535, he sailed to Peru to settle a dispute between Francisco Pizarro and Diego de Almagro over division of territory after the conquest of the Inca Empire.  His ship stalled when the winds died and strong currents carried him out to the Galápagos Islands which he thus discovered on March 10, 1535. He sent an account of the adventure and discovery to Charles V, Holy Roman Emperor and King of Spain. Berlanga resigned his see in 1537.

When Tomás de Berlanga returned to the Berlanga de Duero from America, he brought with him a cayman from the Chagres River in Panama. This cayman measured 3 meters. It is currently on display in the Colegiata de Nuestra Señora del Mercado in Berlanga de Duero.

References

External links and additional sources
 (for Chronology of Bishops) 
 (for Chronology of Bishops) 

1487 births
1551 deaths
People from Soria
Spanish explorers of the Pacific
16th-century Roman Catholic bishops in Panama
Spanish Roman Catholic bishops in North America
Roman Catholic bishops of Panamá